Olevsk Raion was a raion (district) of Zhytomyr Oblast, northern Ukraine. Its administrative centre was located at Olevsk. The raion was abolished on 18 July 2020 as part of the administrative reform of Ukraine, which reduced the number of raions of Zhytomyr Oblast to four. The area of Olevsk Raion was merged into Korosten Raion. The last estimate of the raion population was

References

Former raions of Zhytomyr Oblast
1923 establishments in Ukraine
Ukrainian raions abolished during the 2020 administrative reform